Raymond Thomas may refer to:
 Raymond Thomas (athlete) (1931–2002), French shot putter
 Raymond Thomas (cyclist) (born 1968), Jamaican cyclist
 Raymond A. Thomas (born 1958), retired U.S. Army general

See also 
 Ray Thomas (disambiguation)